Christopher Hugh Chapman (born 5 May 1945) is a British seismologist, an emeritus honorary professor in the Department of Earth Sciences, University of Cambridge.

Biography
He was awarded a first degree in theoretical physics and a Ph.D in geophysics by Cambridge University. He then moved to Canada to be an  Assistant and Associate Professor at the University of Alberta, and an Associate and Full Professor at the University of Toronto. He returned to Cambridge in 1984 to take up an appointment as Professor of Geophysics.

In 1990 he joined Schlumberger Cambridge Research (SCR) as a Scientific Advisor until his retirement in 2005. He continues to consult for SCR and act as Emeritus Honorary Professor of Theoretical Seismology at Cambridge.

He published the geophysics textbook “Fundamentals of Seismic Wave Propagation” in 2004. (Cambridge University Press).

He was a Green Scholar at the Scripps Institution of Oceanography in 1978-9 and 1986, and a Killam fellow in 1981-3. In 2013 he was awarded the Gold Medal of the Royal Astronomical Society "for outstanding personal and collaborative research in geophysics."

References

1945 births
Living people
People educated at Latymer Upper School
Alumni of Christ's College, Cambridge
Schlumberger people
British seismologists
Fellows of the Royal Astronomical Society
Recipients of the Gold Medal of the Royal Astronomical Society